Lovers Rock is the fifth studio album by British rapper and singer Estelle. The album was released on 7 September 2018 by Established 1980 Records. The album was supported by the singles "Love Like Ours", which features Jamaican singer Tarrus Riley, and "Better".

Background
Whilst speaking about the album, Estelle commented that fans had been consistently asking when she would make an entire reggae album since the release of her single "Come Over" featuring Sean Paul, which is taken from her second album, Shine (2008).

Track listing

Notes
  – co-producer
 "Slow Down" is only included on digital and streaming versions of the album

Charts

References

2018 albums
Estelle (musician) albums
VP Records albums